is a Japanese video game producer who works for Bandai Namco Entertainment, best known for his involvement in the Ace Combat series.

Works

References

External links 
 

People from Shinjuku
Japanese video game producers